Ang Kamay ng Diyos is a 1947 Philippine drama film directed by Eddie Romero. It was the first film ever directed by him.

Cast
Gerry De Leon 
Kaycee Romano
Leopoldo Salcedo

External links
 

1947 films
Philippine drama films
Tagalog-language films
Filipino-language films
Films directed by Eddie Romero
1947 drama films
Philippine black-and-white films